is a Japanese slice of life romance shōjo manga series written and illustrated by Ryo Ikuemi and serialized by Shueisha on Bessatsu Margaret magazine. It has five volumes, the first published on 13 September 1997 and the last on 15 August 1999.

Reception
It won the 45th Shogakukan Manga Award for shōjo manga.

References

Romance anime and manga
Shōjo manga
Shueisha manga
Slice of life anime and manga
Winners of the Shogakukan Manga Award for shōjo manga